The Social Christian People's Union was a center-right political party in Romania.

References

Political parties established in 2006
2006 establishments in Romania
Conservative parties in Romania
Registered political parties in Romania
Christian democratic parties in Europe